Fusipagoda is a genus of sea snails, marine gastropod mollusks in the family Retimohniidae, the true whelks and the like.

Species
 Fusipagoda corbis (Dall, 1913)
 Fusipagoda exquisita (Dall, 1913)
 Fusipagoda itohabei Kosyan & Kantor, 2015
 Fusipagoda sapia (Dall, 1919)

References

 Kosyan A.R. & Kantor Yu.I. (2015). Notes on the abyssal genus Fusipagoda Habe et Ito, 1965 (Neogastropoda: Buccinidae) from the North Pacific. Ruthenica. 25(3): 77-87

External links
 Habe T. & Ito K. (Kiyoshi). (1965). New genera and species of shells chiefly collected from the North Pacific. Venus. 24(1): 16-45, pls 2-4.

Retimohniidae
Gastropod genera